The following model codes have been used by Toyota. The letters of the model code is found by combining the letters of the engine code with the platform code. If the engine code and the platform code have two letters each, the middle letter is computed according to this formula:

For vehicles equipped with the Dynamic Force engine series, the model code system is slightly changed as referred by the table below.

Platforms

A

B

C

D

E

F

G

H

J

K 

L

M

N

P

R

S

T

U

V

W

X

Y

Z

XA

XC

XD

XE

XF

XG

XH

XJ

XK

XL

XM

XN

XP

XR

XS

XT

XU

XV

XW

XX

XY

XZ

AA

AB

AC

AE

AF

AG

AH

AJ

AK

AL

AM

AN

AP

AR

AT

AV

AX

AZ

FA

HP

JPD

NTP

RMV

EA

See also 
 Toyota model codes

References

External links 

 Japanese cars online catalogs - Toyota

Notes